Dan Khun Thot is a district (amphoe) in the western part of Nakhon Ratchasima province, Thailand.

History
The town Dan Khun Thot was built before the reign of King Taksin. It became a district in 1908. At the same time, the centre of the town was moved from Wat Pho Chumphon to the west side of Ban Han School. The district was thus renamed Ban Han. Later it was named Phan Chana, until it was again renamed Dan Khun Thot in 1914.

Geography
Neighbouring districts are (from the north clockwise): Bamnet Narong and Chatturat of Chaiyaphum province; Phra Thong Kham, Non Thai, Kham Thale So, Sung Noen, and Sikhio of Nakhon Ratchasima; Lam Sonthi of Lopburi province; and Thepharak of Nakhon Ratchasima.

Administration
The district is divided into 16 sub-districts (tambons). There are three townships (thesaban tambons) within the district: Dan Khun Thot covers parts of tambon Dan Khun Thot, Nong Krat covers parts of tambon Nong Krat, and Nong Bua Takiat covers tambon Nong Bua Takiat.

References

External links
amphoe.com

Dan Khun Thot